Jose Y. Dalisay Jr. (born January 15, 1954) is a Filipino writer. He has won numerous awards and prizes for fiction, poetry, drama, non-fiction and screenwriting, including 16 Palanca Awards.

Early life and education
Dalisay was born in Romblon in 1954. He completed his primary education at La Salle Green Hills, Philippines in 1966 and his secondary education at the Philippine Science High School in 1970. He dropped out of college to work as a newspaper reporter. He also wrote scripts mostly for Lino Brocka, the National Artist of the Philippines for Theater and Film. Dalisay returned to school and earned his B.A. English (Imaginative Writing) degree, cum laude from the University of the Philippines in 1984. He later received an M.F.A. from the University of Michigan in 1988 and a PhD in English from the University of Wisconsin–Milwaukee in 1991 as a Fulbright scholar.

Literary career

Dalisay has authored more than 30 books since 1984. Six of those books have garnered National Book Awards from the Manila Critics Circle. In 1998, Dalisay made it to the Cultural Center of the Philippines (CCP) Centennial Honors List as one of the 100 most accomplished Filipino artists of the past century. Among his numerous books are Oldtimer and Other Stories (Asphodel, 1984; U.P. Press, 2003); Sarcophagus and Other Stories (U.P. Press, 1992); Killing Time in a Warm Place (Anvil, 1992); Madilim ang Gabi sa Laot at Iba Pang mga Dula ng Ligaw na Pag-Ibig (U.P. Press, 1993); Penmanship and Other Stories (Cacho, 1995); The Island (Ayala Foundation, 1996); Pagsabog ng Liwanag/Aninag, Anino (U.P. Press, 1996); Mac Malicsi, TNT/Ang Butihing Babae ng Timog (U.P. Press, 1997); The Lavas: A Filipino Family (Anvil, 1999); The Best of Barfly (Anvil, 1997); The Filipino Flag (Inquirer Publications, 2004); Man Overboard (Milflores, 2005); Journeys with Light: The Vision of Jaime Zobel (Ayala Foundation, 2005); Selected Stories (U.P. Press, 2005); and "The Knowing Is in the Writing: Notes on the Practice of Fiction" (U.P. Press, 2006).

Editor
Dalisay has also worked extensively as a professional editor. He served as Executive Editor of the ten-volume Kasaysayan: The Story of the Filipino People (Manila: Asia Publishing/Reader's Digest Asia , 1998). His clients have included the Asian Development Bank, the Ayala Foundation, SGV & Co., the National Economic and Development Authority, the Office of the (Philippine) President, the Department of Environment and Natural Resources, Philippine Airlines, and the Ramon Magsaysay Awards Foundation, among others.

Achievements

Dalisay has won 16 Palanca Awards in five genres. For winning at least five First Prize awards, he was elevated to the Palanca Hall of Fame in 2000. He has also garnered five Cultural Center of the Philippines awards for playwriting; and FAMAS, URIAN, Star and Catholic Mass Media awards and citations for his screenplays. He also chaired the 1992 ASEAN Writers Conference/Workshop, in Penang, Malaysia. He was named one of The Ten Outstanding Young Men (TOYM) of 1993 for his creative writing. In 2005, he received the Premio Cervara di Roma in Italy for extensively promoting Philippine literature overseas. In 2007, his second novel, Soledad's Sister, was shortlisted for the inaugural Man Asian Literary Prize in Hong Kong.

He has received Hawthornden Castle, British Council, David T.K. Wong, Rockefeller (Bellagio), and Civitella Ranieri fellowships, and has held the Henry Lee Irwin Professorial Chair at the Ateneo de Manila University; and the Jose Joya, Jorge Bocobo, and Elpidio Quirino professorial chairs at U.P. Diliman. He has lectured on Philippine culture and politics at the University of Michigan, University of Auckland, Australian National University, Universiti Kebangsaan Malaysia, St. Norbert College (Wisconsin, U.S.), University of East Anglia, University of Rome, London School of Economics, and the University of California, San Diego, where he was named Pacific Leadership Fellow in 2015..

After serving for three years as English and Comparative Literature Department Chair, Dalisay assumed the post of Vice President for Public Affairs of the U.P. System from May 2003 to February 2005; he returned to the post in February 2017 and retired in January 2019. He is currently a Professor Emeritus of English and creative writing at the College of Arts and Letters, U.P. Diliman, where he also coordinated the creative writing program. He was Director of the U.P. Institute of Creative Writing from 2008 to 2017. Aside from his weekly Arts & Culture column for the Philippine Star, he wrote political and social commentary for the newsmagazine Newsbreak and the San Francisco-based Filipinas magazine.

In 2017, the One UP-Jose Yap Dalisay Jr. Professorial Chair in Creative Writing was endowed in his honor by an anonymous donor at the University of the Philippines.

Notable works

Novels

 Killing Time in a Warm Place, 1992
 Soledad's Sister, 2008
 "Soledad: Rocambolesco Romanzo Filippino" (Italian edition), 2009
 "In Flight: Two Novels of the Philippines" (a combined US edition), 2011
 La Soeur de Soledad," (French edition), 2013

Plays

 Madilim ang Gabi sa Laot at Iba Pang Mga Dula ng Ligaw na Pag-Ibig, 1993
 Pagsabog ng Liwanag/Aninag, Anino, 1996
 Ang Butihing Babae ng Timog/Mac Malicsi, TNT, 1997

Screenplays

More than twenty produced screenplays, including

 Miguelito, 1985
 Tayong Dalawa, 1994 Saranggola, 1999

BOOKS WRITTEN

Fiction
  "Oldtimer and Other Stories" (Quezon City: Asphodel Books, 1984)
  "Sarcophagus and Other Stories" (Quezon City: University of the Philippines Press, 1992)
  "Killing Time in a Warm Place" (Pasig: Anvil Publishing, 1992)
  "Penmanship and Other Stories" (Pasig: Cacho Publishing, 1995)
  "The Island" (Makati: Ayala Foundation, 1996). With Jaime Zobel and Francisco Doplon.
  "Selected Stories" (QC: UP Press, 2005)
  "Soledad’s Sister" (Pasig: Anvil Publishing, 2008)
  "Soledad: Rocambolesco Romanzo Filippino" (Milano: Isbn Edizioni, 2009). Translated by Clara Nubile.
  "In Flight: Two Novels of the Philippines" (Tucson: Schaffner Press, 2011)
  "Pasando el rato en un pais calido" (Barcelona: Libros del Asteroide, 2012). Translated by Marta Alcaraz.
  "La soeur de Soledad" (Paris: Mercure de France, 2013).  Translated by Jean-Pierre Aoustin.
  "Voyager and Other Fictions: The Collected Stories of Jose Dalisay" (Pasig: Anvil Publishing, 2019)

Essays

  "The Best of Barfly" (Pasig: Anvil Publishing, 1997)
  "Man Overboard" (QC: Milflores, 2005)
  "The Knowing Is in the Writing: Notes on the Practice of Fiction" (QC: UP Press, 2006)
  "Why Words Matter" (QC:Center for Art, New Ventures & Sustainable Development, 2019). With illustrations by Marcel Antonio.
  "A Richness of Embarrassments and Other Easy Essays" (Quezon City: UP Press, 2020)

Nonfiction

  "The Lavas: A Filipino Family" (Pasig: Anvil Publishing, 1999)
  "Bandera: The Filipino Flag" (Makati: Inquirer Publications, 2004)
  "Journeys with Light: The Vision of Jaime Zobel" (Makati: Ayala Foundation, 2005)
  "Power from the Deep: The Malampaya Story" (Makati: Shell Philippines, 2005)
  "Unleashing the Power of Steam: The PNOC-EDC Story" (Makati: PNOC-EDC, 2006)
  "Portraits of a Tangled Relationship: The Philippines and the United States" (Manila: Ars Mundi Philippinae, 2008). With Jose Ma. Cariño and others.
  "Wash: Only a Bookkeeper" (Makati: SGV Foundation, 2009)
  "The Voices of the Mountain: The People of Mt. Apo Speak" (Makati: EDC, 2009)
  "Decade of Reform, Decade of Innovation: The GSIS Under PGM Winston Garcia, 2001-2010" (Manila: GSIS, 2010)
  "Builder of Bridges: The Rudy Cuenca Story" (Pasig: Anvil Publishing, 2010). With Antonette Reyes.
  "With Hearts Aflame: The Christian Brothers in the Philippines, 1911-2011" (Mandaluyong: DLSP, 2012)
  "A Man Called Tet" (Pasig: Anvil Publishing, 2015)
  "Edgardo J. Angara: In the Grand Manner" (Quezon City: UP Press, 2015)
  "Harvest of Heroes" (Manila: Land Bank of the Philippines, 2015)
  "Lighting the Second Century, with Exie Abola and Felice Sta. Maria" (Pasig: Meralco, 2015)
  "Lessons from Nationalist Struggle: The Life of Emmanuel Q. Yap), with Josef T. Yap" (Pasig: Anvil Publishing, 2016
  "The Shell Century: Powering Philippine Progress" (Makati: Pilipinas Shell, 2016)
  "Andrew and Mercedes Gotianun: Useless Each Without the Other" (Quezon City; ABS-CBN Publishing, 2018). With Jonathan Gotianun, Josephine Gotianun Yap, and Charlson Ong.
  "Transforming Horizons: The PRSB Story" (Pasig: Philippine Resources Savings Bank, 2019). With Vanessa D. Gregorio.
  "A Millennial Man for Others: The Life and Times of Rafael M. Salas, with Carmen Sarmiento" (Mandaluyong: Commission on Population, 2019)

Drama

  "Madilim ang Gabi sa Laot at Iba Pang mga Dula ng Ligaw na Pag-Ibig" (Quezon City: UP Press, 1993)
  "Pagsabog ng Liwanag / Aninag, Anino" (QC: UP Press, 1996)
  "Ang Butihing Babae ng Timog / Mac Malicsi, TNT" (QC: UP Press, 1997)

Poetry

  "Pinoy Septych and Other Poems" (Manila: UST Publishing, 2011)

Books Edited

  "Kasaysayan: The Story of the Filipino People, 10 volumes" (Manila: Asia Publishing, 1998). Written by various authors.
  "The Likhaan Book of Poetry and Fiction" (Quezon City: UP Press, 1999). With Ricardo de Ungria, written by various authors.
  "From Earth to Sky: The Life and Times of Hans Menzi" (Manila: Menzi Trust Fund, 2001). Written by Alya Honasan.
  "A Promise to Keep: From Athens to Afghanistan" (Xlibris, 2003). Written by Arthur and Julie Hill.
  "Remembering NVM" (Quezon City: University of the Philippines Press, 2004). Written by various authors.
  "Fourteen Love Stories, with Angelo R. La Cuesta" (Quezon City: University of the Philippines Press, 2004).
  "The Silk Road Revisited: Markets, Merchants, and Minarets" (Bloomington: Author House, 2006). Written by Julie Hill.
  "Likhaan: The Journal of Contemporary Philippine Literature" (Quezon City: University of the Philippines Press, 2007). Written by various authors.
  "Hidden Treasures, Simple Pleasures" (Makati: Bookhaven, 2009). Written by Jaime C. 9. Laya, Mariano C. Lao, and Edilberto B. Bravo.
  "Shadow of Doubt: Probing the Supreme Court" (Quezon City: Public Trust Media Group, 2010). Written by Marites Danguilan Vitug.
  "Our Rights, Our Victories: Landmark Cases in the Supreme Court" (Quezon City: Cleverheads Publishing, 2011). Written by Marites Danguilan Vitug and Criselda Yabes.
  "Endless Journey: A Memoir" (Quezon City: Cleverheads Publishing, 2011). Written by Jose T. Almonte with Marites Danguilan Vitug.
  "The Future Begins Here" (Manila: De La Salle University, 2011). Written by various authors.
  "Privileged Witness: Journeys of Rediscovery" (Bloomington: Author House, 2014). Written by Julie Hill.
  "In the Afternoon Sun: My Alexandria" (Makati: Society for Cultural Enrichment, 2017). Written by Julie Hill.
  "Stories from the Heart" (Manila: Philippine Airlines, 2017). Written by various authors.
  "Joey: A Tribute to Joey Concepcion" (Makati: Studio 5, 2017)
  "Rock Solid: How the Philippines Won Its Case Against China" (Quezon City: Ateneo de Manila University Press, 2018). Written by Marites Danguilan Vitug.
  "Gold on the Horizon: Transforming Oriental Mindoro" (Makati: Studio 5, 2018). Written by various authors.
  "Budget Reform in the Philippines" (Pasig: Anvil Publishing, 2019). Written by Ronald Mendoza and David Timberman.
  "The Story of Philippine Central Banking: Stability and Strength at Seventy" (Makati: Studio 5, 2019). Written by various authors.
  "An Appointment with the Vatican: A Biography of Bienvenido R. Tantoco Sr." (Quezon City: Creative Programs, Inc., 2019). Written by Rodolfo G. Silvestre.
  "The Essential Manuel Arguilla Reader" (Pasig: Anvil Publishing, 2019). Written by Manuel Arguilla.

Honors and awards

 Civitella Ranieri Fellowship
 David T.K. Wong Fellowship for Creative Writing, University of East Anglia
 Chamberlain Award
 Milwaukee Fiction Award
 American Poets Prize
 Fulbright- Hays Scholarship
 Hawthornden Castle Fellowship, Scotland
 British Council Fellow to Cambridge
 Word Festival (Australia)
 Asia 2000 (New Zealand)
 Centennial Honors for the Arts, Cultural Center of the Philippines
 Ten Outstanding Young Men (TOYM) of the Philippines
 Cultural Center of the Philippines Awards for Literature
 National Book Awards from the Manila Critics Circle
 FAMAS Award for Best Screenplay
 Catholic Mass Media Award for Best Screenplay
 URIAN citation for Best Screenplay
 Star Awards citation for Best Screenplay
 Palanca Awards for Literature
 Palanca Hall of Fame Winner
 Man Asian Literary Prize 2007 Shortlistee for Soledad's Sister
 7th Department of Tourism Kalakbay Award for Best Travel Writer
 Fellow, Standard Chartered International Literary Festival, Hong Kong
 
 Philippine Graphic Awards
 U.P. President's Award for Outstanding Publications
 Writing fellow, 20th Dumaguete National Writers' Workshop (1981)
 Henry Lee Irwin Professorial Chair, Ateneo de Manila University
 Jose Joya, Jorge Bocobo, and Elpidio Quirino Professorial Chairs at the U.P. Diliman
 Rockefeller Fellowship in Bellagio, Italy
 Premio Cervara di Roma'', Italy
 Has lectured at the University of Michigan, University of Auckland, Australian National University, Universiti Kebangsaan Malaysia, St. Norbert College, University of East Anglia, University of Rome, and the London School of Economics and the University of California, San Diego

See also
Wilfrido Ma. Guerrero
Severino Montano
Rene Villanueva

References and external links

  U.P. Institute of Creative Writing
 Philippine-American Educational Foundation
  20th Dumaguete National Writers Workshop
 Odds and ends from a writer, teacher, and Mac addict from the Philippines
 New Zealand Writers’ Ezine
 National Academy of Science and Technology
 Archipelago
 UP Forum Online
 Cyberdyaryo
 English Speaking Union
 
 University of Michigan
 Remembering NVM by Jose Y. Dalisay Jr.
 University of East Anglia
 Christchurch City Council, New Zealand
 Filipinas Heritage Library
 University of Wisconsin–Milwaukee
 Association of Academies of Sciences in Asia
 University of California, San Diego
 Philippine Star
 University of California, Berkeley
 Kalakbay Awards, Department of Tourism
 2nd Hong Kong International Literary Festival
 Philippine Science High School Alumni Association
 Manunuri ng Pelikulang Pilipino 1977
 Manunuri ng Pelikulang Pilipino 1985
 University of Hawaii at Manola Library
 University of Illinois at Springfield
  The Don Carlos Palanca Awards 1987
 Jose Y. Dalisay Jr., Ph.D. at Mac.com
 Jose Y. Dalisay Jr., Saranggola, Review Summary, Filmography, Movies, The New York Times, 1999
 Jose Y. Dalisay Jr., Saranggola, Filmography, Movies, The New York Times, 1999
 

Tagalog-language writers
People from Romblon
University of Michigan alumni
University of Wisconsin–Milwaukee alumni
Filipino male short story writers
Filipino short story writers
Filipino dramatists and playwrights
Teachers of English
University of the Philippines alumni
Academic staff of the University of the Philippines
1954 births
Living people
Palanca Award recipients
Academics of the University of East Anglia
The Philippine Star people
Writers from Romblon
Marcos martial law victims
Marcos martial law prisoners jailed at Ipil Detention Center